North Glenview (signed as The Glen of North Glenview) is one of two commuter railroad stations on Metra's Milwaukee District North Line in Glenview, Illinois. In Metra's zone-based fare system, North Glenview is in zone D. As of 2018, North Glenview is the 34th busiest of Metra's 236 non-downtown stations, with an average of 1,163 weekday boardings.

As of December 12, 2022, North Glenview is served by 44 trains (19 inbound, 25 outbound) on weekdays, by all 20 trains (10 in each direction) on Saturdays, and by all 18 trains (nine in each direction) on Sundays and holidays.

It is proposed that the Amtrak trains, the Hiawatha Service and Empire Builder, which currently serve , one stop south, would shift here. This move would eliminate lengthy stops which block traffic on Glenview Road. This move would involve reconstruction of the North Glenview station to handle the additional traffic, and depends on commitments from Glenview, the Illinois General Assembly and Metra.

Bus connections
Pace
 423 Linden CTA/The Glen/Harlem CTA (weekdays only) 
 623 Glen of North Glenview-Metra Station/Willow Road Corridor (weekday rush hours only)

References

External links

Station House from Google Maps Street View

Metra stations in Illinois
Railway stations in the United States opened in 2001
Glenview, Illinois
Railway stations in Cook County, Illinois